Lake Ridge is a lake-view, master planned development in Dallas' southwest suburbs near Joe Pool Lake.  Lake Ridge is located in the cities of Cedar Hill and Grand Prairie.  Most of the homes in Lake Ridge are custom built and are on large lots which are often wooded and sit on a hill.  Lake ridge is divided into three individual gated and non-gated neighborhoods: Sanctuary, Summit, and Preserve.

Education 
Lake Ridge is within the Cedar Hill ISD.
Part of Lake Ridge is within the Midlothian ISD.

References

External links 
 Lake Ridge at Joe Pool Lake
 Sanctuary at Lake Ridge

Dallas–Fort Worth metroplex
Geography of Dallas County, Texas